The French Guiana national football team is the regional football team of the French overseas department and region of French Guiana, and is controlled by the Ligue de Football de Guyane, the local branch of Fédération Française de Football.

Overview
As an overseas department of the French Republic, it is an integral part of France and thus not a member of FIFA. French Guiana is therefore not eligible to enter a team in the World Cup independent of France. As full citizens of France, indistinguishable from any other French citizen, French Guianans are eligible to play for the France national football team. 

Bernard Lama and Florent Malouda are two examples of Guianese players who have played for the France national team. Lama winning the 1998 World Cup, and UEFA Euro 2000. Malouda playing as a runner-up during the 2006 World Cup.

CONCACAF

However, French Guiana is a member of CONCACAF and CFU, and thus eligible for all competitions organized by both. For any purpose outside of World Cup competition, all of the regional continental confederations may allow teams to be entered by territories that are de jure part of a country the bulk of which is located in a different continental confederation region.  

According to the status of the FFF (article 34, paragraph 6): "[...]Under the control of related continental confederations, and with the agreement of the FFF, those leagues can organize international sport events at a regional level or set up teams in order to participate to them."

Results and fixtures
The following matches have been played within the past 12 months.

2022

2023

Coaching history

  Marie-Rose Carême (2004–2005)
  Ghislain Zulémaro (2008–2010)
  Steeve Falgayrettes* (2011–2012)
  François Louis-Marie &  Hubert Contout (2012–2013)
  Jaïr Karam &  Marie-Rose Carême (2013–2018)
  Thierry De Neef (2018–present)

Players

Current squad
The following players were included in the French Guiana men's senior squad for the 2022–23 CONCACAF Nations League matches against Guatemala, Dominican Republic and Belize on 2, 5, 9 and 14 June 2022.

Caps and goals as of 14 June 2022, after the match against Belize.

Recent call-ups

Player records

Players in bold are still active with French Guiana.

Most capped players

Top goalscorers

Competitive record

CONCACAF Gold Cup

CONCACAF Nations League

Caribbean Cup

Head-to-head record
As of 17 November 2019 after match against

References

External links
   of the French Guiana Football Federation
 French Guiana at CONCACAF site (archived 16 January 2014)

 
CONCACAF teams not affiliated to FIFA
National football teams of Overseas France
South American national association football teams
Caribbean national association football teams
Football in French Guiana